Had-Sahary is a town and commune in Djelfa Province, Algeria. According to the 1998 census it has a population of 22,277.

References

Communes of Djelfa Province
Djelfa Province